Markus Feldhoff (born 29 August 1974) is a German football, who last managed VfL Osnabrück and former player.

Club career
Earlier in his career Feldhoff played for Bayer Uerdingen, Bayer 04 Leverkusen, Borussia Mönchengladbach, VfL Wolfsburg and FC Energie Cottbus.

In his career, he played 158 games and scored 25 goals. Feldhoff collected 13 caps for the German U21 squad. Following a series of  injuries he announced his retirement from active play.

Coaching career
In December 2006, while still playing for Osnabrück and was recovering from a cruciate ligament rupture, Feldhoff took over as manager at Landesliga club TV Jahn Hiesfeld, which he was unable to save from relegation to the Bezirksliga. Immediately before the start of the 2007/08 season, he decided to give up the post again in order to be able to concentrate fully on his active career after a lengthy injury layoff.

In January 2008, however, he had to end his career as a professional footballer due to another knee injury. In April 2008 it was confirmed, that Feldhoff would take charge of SSVg Velbert from the 2008-09 season. However, he resigned from his position already in October 2008. In December 2008, Feldhoff was appointed assistant coach of Claus-Dieter Wollitz at VfL Osnabrück under an internship contract that ran until 30 June 2010.

For the 2009-10 season, Feldhoff followed Claus-Dieter Wollitz to FC Energie Cottbus. Following Wollitz's resignation, Feldhoff took over the team as interim coach on 8 December 2011 until the winter break. Feldhoff decided to resign in December 2012, as he wanted to work as a head coach.

In June 2014, Feldhoff was appointed U-19 manager at SC Paderborn 07. In March 2016, he was promoted to the first team staff, as assistant coach to René Müller. In October 2016, Feldhoff left his job at SC Paderborn 07 to join Bundesliga club Werder Bremen in a similar position. With the dismissal of manager Alexander Nouri a year later, Werder also parted ways with Feldhoff.

He followed Alexander Nouri to FC Ingolstadt, when the manager and his staff, including Feldhoff, was hired on 24 September 2018. After eight games without a win, Feldhoff and co. was fired at the end of November 2018.

A year later, at the end of November 2019, Felhoff and Nouri became assistant coaches of Jürgen Klinsmann at Hertha BSC. Feldhoff then assisted Nouri in four Bundesliga matches after Klinsmann resigned as head coach. Nouri and Feldhoff's involvement ended in early April 2020.

He was appointed as the new head coach of VfL Osnabrück on 3 March 2021. After the team got relegated to the 3. Liga, his contract was not renewed.

References

External links

Living people
1974 births
Sportspeople from Oberhausen
Association football forwards
German footballers
Germany under-21 international footballers
Bayer 04 Leverkusen players
Borussia Mönchengladbach players
VfL Wolfsburg players
FC Energie Cottbus players
KFC Uerdingen 05 players
VfL Osnabrück players
SSVg Velbert players
Bundesliga players
2. Bundesliga players
German football managers
FC Energie Cottbus managers
VfL Osnabrück managers
2. Bundesliga managers
Footballers from North Rhine-Westphalia
SSVg Velbert managers